Marina Canetta Gobbi (born 1 April 1989 in São Paulo) is a Brazilian recurve archer. She competed in the archery competition at the 2016 Summer Olympics in Rio de Janeiro.

References

External links
 

Brazilian female archers
Living people
1989 births
Archers at the 2016 Summer Olympics
Olympic archers of Brazil
South American Games silver medalists for Brazil
South American Games medalists in archery
Competitors at the 2014 South American Games
Sportspeople from São Paulo
20th-century Brazilian women
21st-century Brazilian women